Dichomeris melitura is a moth in the family Gelechiidae. It was described by Edward Meyrick in 1916. It is found in southern India.

The forewings are dark ashy grey with a faint violet tinge, sprinkled with black specks and with a short oblique black streak in the disc at one-third. The costal edge is shortly blackish beyond the middle. The hindwings are dark grey.

References

Moths described in 1916
melitura